Lola is a 1961 romantic drama film written and directed by Jacques Demy (in his feature directorial debut) as a tribute to director Max Ophüls, described by Demy as a "musical without music". Anouk Aimée stars in the title role. The film was restored and re-released by Demy's widow, French filmmaker Agnès Varda.

The names of the film and title character were inspired by Josef von Sternberg's 1930 film The Blue Angel, in which Marlene Dietrich played a burlesque performer named Lola Lola.

Plot
In the seaside French town of Nantes, a young man, Roland Cassard, is wasting his life away until he has a chance encounter with Lola, a woman he knew as a teenager before World War II, who is now a cabaret dancer. Although Roland is quite smitten with her, Lola is preoccupied with her former lover Michel, who abandoned her after impregnating her seven years earlier. Also vying for Lola's heart is American sailor Frankie, whose affection Lola does not return.

Struggling for work, Roland gets involved in a diamond-smuggling plot with a local barber. Cécile, a 13-year-old girl, crosses paths with Roland; in many ways she reminds him of Lola, whose real name is also Cécile. In the end, Michel returns to Nantes, apparently very successful and hoping to marry Lola, just as she is leaving for another job in Marseille. She goes away with Michel as she always said she would.

Critical reception
Lola received moderate reviews from critics. Chicago Reader Jonathan Rosenbaum wrote it was "among the most neglected major works of the French New Wave" and "in some ways [Demy's] best feature."

Travis Hooper of Film Freak Central gave it three-and-a-half out of four stars, stating that he believed that it "doesn't have the intellectual rigour of those other films". He went on to write that it "is stronger for feeling, showing that we need more than the confirmation of the worst if we intend to make it through our lives intact."

Not Just Movies gave Lola an A rating, mostly for Demy's "New Wave-cum-classical style", which "creates a self-contained world that gives a softly lit haze to reality as characters constantly aim for each other and miss, sometimes passing within mere inches of each other before carrying on or being redirected."

Wong Kar-Wai cited Lola as a primary influence on his film Chungking Express (1994), in inspiring that film's second half.

Awards and nominations
 1963 BAFTA – Nominated for Best Film from Any Source and Best Foreign Actress for Anouk Aimée
 2001 New York Film Critics Circle Awards – Won the Special Award (also for the re-release of Demy's second film Bay of Angels)

See also
 Model Shop

References

External links
 
 
 
 Lola: Demy's Paradise Found – an essay by Ginette Vincendeau at The Criterion Collection
 

1961 films
1961 romantic drama films
1960s English-language films
1960s French films
1960s French-language films
1960s Italian films
1960s multilingual films
English-language French films
English-language Italian films
Films directed by Jacques Demy
Films produced by Carlo Ponti
Films scored by Michel Legrand
Films set in Nantes
French black-and-white films
French multilingual films
French romantic drama films
French-language Italian films
Italian black-and-white films
Italian multilingual films
Italian romantic drama films